Viktor Stepurko (born December 22, 1951) is a Ukrainian composer. 

In 1975–1981 Stepurko studied in Kyiv Conservatory. Since 1983 he lives in Makariv, where he teaches in musical school and leads ensemble. Since 2004 he teaches in National Academy of Government Managerial Staff of Culture and Arts.

Selected works 
Music
Symphonic poem "Islands of Childhood";
Opera "The Music store";
Three choirs on a lyrics by I. Drach
Choirs on lyrics by Taras Shevchenko: "Flowing Water" (1984), "Over the Dnieper Saga" (1986), Cycle "My Dawn", "Dawn, the edge of the sky burns", "False fear is bad", "Oh oak, dark grove";
Spiritual choirs "Prayer litany", "I believe", "Hear me, Lord", "Psalms of David" (2010), Liturgy of St. John Chrysostom (2011), "Kyiv frescoes" (2016), Confessional liturgy;
 "Confessional Liturgy" of the bright memory of Hetman Ivan Mazepa. For reader, symphony orchestra and organ (2004).

Scientific
The manifestations of artistic introversion in the works of composers of Ukraine in the second half of the XX – beginning of the XXI century (2017), dissertation of the candidate of art history.

Honors 
 Levko Revutsky award, 1989
 Ivan Ogienko award, 1998
 Boris Lyatoshinsky award, 2002
 Mykola Lysenko award, 2005
 Shevchenko National Prize, 2012

References

External links 
 Music-review page
 Viktor Stepurko on Ukrainian national composer's union page

Further reading 
 Famous Makariv residents. Victor Stepurko
 Vasylenko O. (2018) Victor Stepurkо’s choral heritage and its functioning in the contemporary performing space in Chasopys. No. 2(39), pp. 30-40 
 Ashchenko N., Buket Ye., Netreba D. (2006). Essays on the history of Makariv district: To the 15th anniversary of Independence of Ukraine [Нариси з історії Макарівського району: До 15-ї річниці Незалежності України]. Kyiv. Pp.128–129.

1951 births
Living people
Ukrainian composers
20th-century classical composers
21st-century classical composers